Õnne Pillak (born 23 February 1983) is an Estonian politician, representing the Estonian Reform Party since 2001. On 27 January 2021, she became a member of the XIV Riigikogu.

Education and career
Õnne Pillak was born in Tallinn. She graduated from Tallinn Nõmme Gymnasium in 2002. From 2002 to 2006, she studied public administration at the Estonian Business School (EBS). From 2007 to 2013, he studied small business at Tallinn University of Technology Kuressaare College. From 2014, she returned the Estonian Business School to study entrepreneurship and business management.

From 2004 until 2005, she was a consultant to the Nõmme District Government. In 2005, she was an advisor to the Deputy Mayor of Tallinn City Government. In the years 2006 until 2011, she was the advisor and head of the secretariat of the Riigikogu Reform Party faction. From 2011 until 2015, she was an advisor to the Ministry of Culture. From 2018 until 2021, she was the assistant and adviser to the vice-chairman of the Riigikogu.

Pillak has been a member of the Tallinn City Council since 2009. On 27 January 2021, she became a member of the XIV Riigikogu, representing the Reform Party.

Personal life
Pillak is married and the mother of twins. She resides in Tallinn.

References

External links
Õnne Pillak at Riigikogu.ee

1983 births
Living people
Estonian Reform Party politicians
Members of the Riigikogu, 2019–2023
Women members of the Riigikogu
Tallinn University of Technology alumni
Politicians from Tallinn
21st-century Estonian women politicians